Eugene Huff (October 6, 1929 – December 8, 2011) was an American politician.

Born in Franklin, Ohio, pastor of First Pentecostal Church, founder of Good News Outreach Ministries and WYGE Christian Radio. Huff served in the Kentucky House of Representatives and then was elected to the Kentucky State Senate serving until 1994, when he retired. He died in London, Kentucky

Notes

External links

1929 births
2011 deaths
People from London, Kentucky
People from Franklin, Ohio
Members of the Kentucky House of Representatives
Kentucky state senators
Deaths from lung disease